The FAMAS Award for Best Actor is one of the FAMAS Awards given to people working in the motion picture industry by the Filipino Academy of Movie Arts and Sciences Award, which are voted on by Palanca Award-winning writers and movie columnists and writers within the industry.

Winners and nominees

The list may be incomplete such as some of the names of the nominees and the roles portrayed especially during the early years of FAMAS Awards.

In the lists below, the winner of the award for each year is shown first, followed by the other nominees.

‡ – indicates the winner

Superlatives

Eddie Garcia won the award more than any actors with six wins. Joseph Estrada, Fernando Poe Jr. and Christopher De Leon have also won the award five times. All four of them are inducted to the FAMAS Hall of Fame. Allen Dizon just recently won his 5th Best Actor and is eligible for Hall of Fame induction in 2022.
Three actors have won the award consecutively. They are Christopher De Leon (in 1991 and 1992), Allen Dizon (in 2010 and 2011), and ER Ejercito (in 2012, 2013 and 2014)

References

External links
The Unofficial Website of the Filipino Academy of Movie Arts and Sciences
FAMAS Awards

Best Actor
Film awards for lead actor